Agonomalus proboscidalis is a fish in the family Agonidae. It was described by Achille Valenciennes in 1858, originally under the genus Aspidophorus (now Agonus). It is a marine, polar water-dwelling fish which is known from the northwestern Pacific Ocean, including northern Japan, the Sea of Japan, and the Sea of Okhotsk.

Agonomalus proboscidalis is a commercial aquarium fish.

References

proboscidalis
Taxa named by Achille Valenciennes
Fish described in 1858